Helene Lerner is the founder of WomenWorking.com. She is an author, independent public television host, Emmy award-winning executive producer, and consultant for diverse women in the workplace. Throughout her career, Lerner has focused on issues, including building confidence in working women, channeling personal power, breaking barriers, and sharing broader professional advice.

Education 
A member of Phi Beta Kappa, Lerner holds an MBA from Pace University and a master's degree in education from City College in New York City, where she resides.

Career 
Lerner began her career as a public school teacher in New York City. Gravitating towards the business world, she moved to sales and marketing at The New York Times in the 1980s. There she began working her way up through the management ranks.

Books 
Lerner is the author of The Confidence Myth: Why Women Undervalue Their Skills and How to Get Over It (2015). They earned praise for her insights on working women.

Creative Expansions, Inc. 
Lerner is the CEO of Creative Expansions, Inc., a multi-media company targeted at women and girls. Since its conception in 1994, Lerner has produced and hosted over twenty televised specials under Creative Expansions, Inc. Lerner's website for career women, WomenWorking.com, is the most active medium under the company's umbrella. Lerner stars in and produces three online miniseries on YouTube, including Unapologetically Honest, Career Advice 101, and Lifestyle Hacks.

Recent work 
Lerner heads a private practice, coaching individuals and groups on empowerment, leadership, and diversity issues.

Awards 
Lerner is the recipient of two regional Emmy and many Gracie Awards, named in honor of comedienne Gracie Allen, given to encourage positive and realistic portrayals of women in the media.

References

Year of birth missing (living people)
Living people